The Internationales Luftfahrt-Museum is an aviation museum located in the German town of Villingen-Schwenningen in Baden-Württemberg. Many aerospace exhibits are on display including fixed-wing aircraft, helicopters and aircraft engines. The main display is contained within one hangar with other aircraft displayed externally on a site covering 13,000 square metres. In addition to the aircraft exhibits a number of aircraft components and a collection of ejection seats are also held by the museum.

Aircraft on display
The museum has over 50 aircraft on display and a collection of 350 model aircraft.

Piston engine aircraft

Antonov An-2
Aero L-60 Brigadýr
Braunschweig LF-1 Zaunkönig
CP.301S Smaragd 
Dornier Do 27
Dornier Do 335
Fischer Brause
Focke-Wulf FWP-149D
Fokker E.III
Fokker Dr.I
Hirth Acrostar
Vogt Lo.120S
Yakovlev Yak-18T
Zlin Z-37A Cmelak

Jet aircraft

Armstrong Whitworth Sea Hawk
Canadair Sabre
Dassault/Dornier Alpha Jet
de Havilland Vampire
English Electric Canberra
Fiat G.91
Lockheed T-33
Lockheed F-104G Starfighter
Mikoyan-Gurevich MiG-15
Mikoyan-Gurevich MiG-21

Gliders
Akaflieg Stuttgart FS-26 Moseppl motor glider
DFS SG 38 Schulgleiter
Fauvel AV.36
Neukom Elfe
Raab Doppelraab
Schneider Grunau Baby
Schleicher Ka 6

Helicopters
Aerospatiale Alouette II
MBB Bo 105
Saro Skeeter

Aircraft engines

Piston engines
Elizalde Tigre
Shvetsov ASh-62

Gas turbine engines
de Havilland Ghost

See also
List of aerospace museums

References
Notes

External links

 

Internationales Luftfahrt-Museum
Internationales Luftfahrt-Museum
Museums established in 1988
Internationales Luftfahrt-Museum
Villingen-Schwenningen
Buildings and structures in Schwarzwald-Baar-Kreis